Nepp is a German surname. Notable people with the surname include:

Dominik Nepp (born 1982), Austrian politician 
Manfred Nepp, German cyclist
Uwe Nepp (born 1966), German cyclist

German-language surnames